Anna, quel particolare piacere (internationally released as Anna: the Pleasure, the Torment and Secrets of a Call Girl) is a 1972 Italian crime-drama film directed by Giuliano Carnimeo. It was referred as a film with a good cinematography and actors appropriate to their roles but unbalanced between its parts.

Plot    
The young and beautiful Anna is linked to Guido, a drug trafficker embroiled in shady turns of Milan in the seventies. While pregnant, the woman refuses to have an abortion and gives birth to Paolo, a sick child in need of continuous care. During one of Guido's many detentions, Anna meets Lorenzo, a world-famous Milanese surgeon: the man saves Paolo's life with a delicate operation. Released from prison, Guido tries to hinder in every way the romantic relationship born in the meantime between Lorenzo and Anna. The woman, exasperated by Guido's constant ambushes, reacts by shooting the man who, before dying, manages to wound her. Emergency surgery by Lorenzo, Anna loses her life, and Lorenzo decides to adopt Paolo.

Cast 
 Edwige Fenech: Anna
 Richard Conte: Soriani
 John Richardson: Lorenzo
 Corrado Pani: Guido 
 Corrado Gaipa:  Doctor  
 Bruno Corazzari: Albino
 Nino Casale:accomplice of Soriani
 Laura Bonaparte: Loredana
 Shirley Corrigan: Lise
 Ennio Balbo: Frossi
 Paolo Lena:Paul
 Carla Calò: mom of Anna
 Gabriella Giacobbe: Nun
 Umberto Raho: lawyer of Sogliani
 Wilma Casagrande: Susy
 Ettore Manni: Zuco
 Antonio Casale: Sogliani's henchman

See also    
 List of Italian films of 1972

References

External links

1972 films
Italian crime drama films
Films directed by Giuliano Carnimeo
1972 crime drama films
1970s Italian-language films
1970s Italian films